Henryk Holland (Warsaw, 8 April 1920 – 21 December 1961, Warsaw) was a Polish sociologist, journalist, writer, captain in the Polish People's Army, and communist activist. He was the father of film directors Agnieszka Holland and Magdalena Łazarkiewicz.

References

1920 births
1961 deaths